Quirky is another name for eccentric behavior or something out of the ordinary in general.

It may also refer to:
 Quirky (company), an industrial design company
 Quirky, a 2011 reality television show set at the company that aired on the Sundance Channel
 Quirky subject, a linguistic phenomenon
 Quirky!, an abstract strategy board game; see List of board games
 Quirky Linux, an experimental Linux distribution related to Puppy Linux
 Quirky (book), a 2018 book by Melissa Schilling

See also
 Quirk (disambiguation)